Mary Elizabeth Heffernan is an American attorney, judge, and former Massachusetts Secretary of Public Safety. She previously served as the Undersecretary of Criminal Justice from 2007 to 2010. She is also a former Assistant District Attorney for Middlesex County.

Biography
Heffernan is an alumnus of Framingham State College, Suffolk University Law School, and Suffolk University School of Management. She is a member of the Framingham State University Board of Trustees. She resides in West Roxbury with her two children.

In the private sector, Heffernan served as the Associate General Counsel and Director of Intergovernmental and Regulatory Affairs at Beth Israel Deaconess Medical Center and as the Corporate Director of Government Relations for CareGroup Health Care System.

In 2017, she was appointed as Newton District Court judge.

Controversy
Soon after her appointment as a Newton District Court judge, she released a suspected rapist – who was in the country illegally and had previously deported – on $2,500 bail despite a request by the district attorney for a much higher bail of $100,000 and despite knowing that U.S. Immigration and Customs Enforcement (ICE) was preparing a detainer for the suspect. In addition prosecutors during the hearing informed Judge Heffernan that the suspect was well known to them as a gang member in the city and was a very high flight risk. Furthermore, not wanting to further inconvenience the suspect allowed him to remain at the courthouse while bail was posted instead of sending him back to the jail awaiting bond to be posted. The suspect failed to appear at his next court date.

References

Massachusetts Secretaries of Public Safety
Lawyers from Boston
Framingham State University alumni
Suffolk University Law School alumni
Suffolk University alumni
Living people
21st-century American politicians
21st-century American women politicians
21st-century American judges
Women in Massachusetts politics
Year of birth missing (living people)